Un peu de soleil dans l'eau froide, internationally released as A Few Hours of Sunlight and A Little Sun in Cold Water, is a 1971 French film directed Jacques Deray adapted from the novel of Françoise Sagan. The title quotes the poet Paul Éluard.

Synopsis 
In Limoges, Nathalie Silvener, a married woman falls for Gilles, a depressed and brilliant Parisian journalist, himself in a relationship with a model.

Casting 
 Claudine Auger : Nathalie Silvener
 Marc Porel : Gilles Lantier
 Judith Magre : Odile
 Nadine Alari : Gilda
 André Falcon : Florent 
 Barbara Bach : Héloïse / Elvire
 Bernard Fresson : Jean
 Jean-Claude Carrière : François
 Gérard Depardieu : Pierre
 Marc Eyraud : Monsieur Rouargue
 Jacques Debary : Fairmont
 Guido Mannari : Thomas
 Mireille Perrey

Reception
According to Cahiers du cinéma, the film is one of the most personal works of Deray. Le Nouvel Observateur referred to it as "un petit film démodé comme le petit roman de Sagan" (i.e., "a little film which is old-fashioned in the same way the little novel by Sagan is"). Time Out was very critical, calling it "fatuous" and saying "Porel gives one of the most boring, suburban, asexual performances imaginable". DVD Talk called it "dated and dull".

The novel
It is based on a 1969 book by Françoise Sagan. BSCNews calls it "a superb novel", praising Sagan's "simple and poetic" style.

References

External links

1971 films
French drama films
1970s French-language films
Films based on French novels
Films based on works by Françoise Sagan
Films directed by Jacques Deray
1971 drama films
Films with screenplays by Jean-Claude Carrière
Films scored by Michel Legrand
1970s French films